Founded in 2003, the Institute on Medicine as a Profession (IMAP) is an American non-profit health care policy think tank housed at Columbia University in New York City.  Its primary area of focus is the concept of medical professionalism. Other areas of IMAP's academic focus include conflicts of interest in the health care industry; the role of physicians in national security interrogations; marketing practices in the drug, alcohol, food and tobacco industries; and health information technology.  IMAP also funds a physician advocacy grants program that aims to train physicians to advocate for policy change at the local, state and national level.  It is also a partner and co-sponsor of the China-US Center on Medical Professionalism based in Beijing.

History and Funding 
IMAP grew from the Open Society Institute’s Medicine as a Profession initiative, which ran from 1999-2004.  In 2003, the Open Society Institute gave a grant of $7.5 million  to establish the Institute on Medicine as  Profession as an independent entity, to be chaired by David J. Rothman, professor at Columbia University, and housed at Columbia's College of Physicians and Surgeons.

The Institute has also received grants from Pew Charitable Trusts, the ABIM Foundation, the American Legacy Foundation, and Permanente Medical Group.  It does not accept funding from industry sources.

References

External links
 Institute on Medicine as a Profession website
 Open Society Institute website

Institutes based in the United States
Think tanks based in the United States